Kateřina Vacíková (born 1 February 1983) is a Czech female canoeist who won 13 medals at senior level at the Wildwater Canoeing World Championships and European Wildwater Championships.

References

External links
 Kateřina Vacíková at Denik.cz

1983 births
Living people
Czech female canoeists
Place of birth missing (living people)